Alvin Ryan Bubb (born 11 October 1980) is a Grenadian international footballer who plays as a left winger.

Early and personal life
Born in Paddington, England, Bubb is cousin to fellow players Byron Bubb and Bradley Bubb.

Club career
Bubb made 14 appearances in the Football League for Queens Park Rangers and Bristol Rovers. He later played non-league football for Billericay Town, Slough Town, Aylesbury United and Wealdstone.

International career
Bubb has earned international caps for Grenada.

References

1980 births
Living people
English footballers
Grenadian footballers
Grenada international footballers
Queens Park Rangers F.C. players
Bristol Rovers F.C. players
Billericay Town F.C. players
Slough Town F.C. players
Aylesbury United F.C. players
Wealdstone F.C. players
English Football League players
English sportspeople of Grenadian descent
Association football wingers
Footballers from Paddington